The Sandown Guineas is a Melbourne Racing Club Group 2 Thoroughbred horse race for three year olds at set weights run over a distance of 1600 metres at Sandown Racecourse, Melbourne, Australia in mid November. Prize money is  A$300,000.

History

The race was initially introduced for three year old fillies. In 1968 the race was opened for all three year olds. From 1957-1964, 2013 and 2021-2022 the race was run at Caulfield Racecourse.

Grade
1968–1978 - Principal race
 1979 onwards  - Group 2

Distance
 1957–1967 - 1 mile (~1600 metres)
 1968–1969 - 1 mile 2 furlongs (~2100 metres)
 1970–1971 - 1 mile (~1600 metres)
 1972 onwards - 1600 metres

Winners

For three-year-olds 		

 2022 - See You In Heaven
 2021 - Blue Army
 2020 - Allibor
 2019 - Pretty Brazen
 2018 - Ringerdingding
 2017 - Villermont
 2016 - Morton's Fork
 2015 - Mahuta
 2014 - Petrology
 2013 - Paximadia
 2012 - Tatra
 2011 - So Swift
 2010 - Pressday
 2009 - Kidnapped
 2008 - Caymans
 2007 - Schilling
 2006 - Sender
 2005 - Cayambe
 2004 - Binding
 2003 - Pay Keys
 2002 - Dextrous
 2001 - Moon Dragon
 2000 - Scenic Warrior
 1999 - Over
 1998 - Sedation
 1997 - Special Dane
 1996 - King Ivor
 1995 - Peep On The Sly
 1994 - Baryshnikov
 1993 - Voting
 1992 - Navy Seal
 1991 - Star Video -
 1990 - Durbridge
 1989 - Stargazer
 1988 - Blixen
 1987 - Ascot Lane
 1986 - Sea Swell
 1985 - Shankhill Lass
 1984 - Brave Salute
 1983 - Mr. Ironclad
 1982 - Cossack Prince
 1981 - Galleon
 1980 - Polar Air
 1979 - Snowing
 1978 - Just A Steal
 1977 - So Called
 1976 - Opposition
 1975 - Better Draw
 1974 - Shiftmar 
 1973 - Taj Rossi
 1972 - Carnation For Me
 1971 - Andros
 1970 - Abdul
 1969 - Top Flat
 1968 - Always There

For three-year-old fillies only 

 1967 - Begonia Belle
 1966 - Hialeah
 1965 - Fire Band
 1964 - Light Fingers
 1963 - Ripa
 1962 - Birthday Card
 1961 - Indian Summer
 1960 - Lady Sybil
 1959 - Twilight Glow
 1958 - But Beautiful
 1957 - Orient

See also
 List of Australian Group races
 Group races

References

Flat horse races for three-year-olds
Horse races in Australia